Hirschegg was a municipality in Austria, merged in 2015 into Hirschegg-Pack, in the district of Voitsberg in the Austrian state of Styria, in south central Austria.

Geography
It is on the border between Styria and Carinthia.

References

Cities and towns in Voitsberg District